Leonie Maria Walter (born 17 January 2004) is a German visually impaired cross-country skier and biathlete who competed at the 2022 Winter Paralympics.

Career
Walter represented Germany at the 2022 Winter Paralympics and won a gold medal in the women's 10 kilometres, and three bronze medals in the women's 6 kilometres, and 12.5 kilometres biathlon events, and in the 15 kilometre classical cross-country skiing event.

References 

Living people
2004 births
Biathletes at the 2022 Winter Paralympics
Cross-country skiers at the 2022 Winter Paralympics
Medalists at the 2022 Winter Paralympics
Paralympic gold medalists for Germany
Paralympic bronze medalists for Germany
Paralympic medalists in biathlon
Paralympic medalists in cross-country skiing
Paralympic biathletes of Germany
Paralympic cross-country skiers of Germany
21st-century German women